Veera Rojpojanarat (born 11 March 1952) is a retired Thai civil servant. He held various positions in the Ministry of Culture, and served as Minister of Culture in the first cabinet of Prime Minister Prayut Chan-o-cha.

He serves as chairman of the Office of Knowledge Management and Development.

References 

Veera Rojpojanarat
Veera Rojpojanarat
Veera Rojpojanarat
Veera Rojpojanarat
Veera Rojpojanarat
Living people
1952 births
Place of birth missing (living people)
Veera Rojpojanarat